Philippine Forest Corporation is a Philippine government controlled corporation. It is under the Department of Environment and Natural Resources.

References

Department of Environment and Natural Resources (Philippines)
Forestry agencies (parastatal)
Forestry in the Philippines